The 2021 European Rugby Champions Cup Final was the final match in the 2020–21 European Rugby Champions Cup, and the twenty-sixth European club rugby final in general. The final was between French teams La Rochelle and Toulouse.

Background
English referee Luke Pearce was officiating a Champions Cup final for the first time. Aged 33, he was the youngest referee to officiate at the final.
A maximum of 10,000 fans were allowed to attend the final at Twickenham.

La Rochelle were appearing in their first final, with Toulouse appearing in the final for the seventh time, winning on four occasions in 1996, 2003, 2005, and 2010.

Toulouse won the game 22-17 to claim their fifth title.

Match

Details

References

Final
2020
May 2021 sports events in the United Kingdom
International rugby union competitions hosted by England
2020–21 in French rugby union
European Rugby Champions Cup Final